Eugene Milo Packard (July 13, 1887, in Colorado Springs, Colorado – May 19, 1959, in Riverside, California) was a professional baseball pitcher who played in the Major Leagues from 1912 through 1919 for the Cincinnati Reds, Chicago Cubs, Kansas City Packers, St. Louis Cardinals and Philadelphia Phillies.

On August 3, 1918, while with the Cardinals, he gave up 12 runs in a game and did not take the loss. That feat was not matched for 90 years, until Scott Feldman of the Texas Rangers did the same on August 13, 2008.

One of the minor league teams Packard played for was the Independence Jewelers, based in Independence, Kansas, in 1908. Packard pitched a one-hit shutout against Tulsa, Oklahoma on July 26. On August 10, the local newspaper headline read "Packard Breaks World's Record". The game the newspaper was referring to was against Bartlesville, Oklahoma on August 8, and Packard had pitched a perfect game.

To this day, he is the only player in major league history to bear the surname Packard.

References

External links
, or Retrosheet, or SABR Biography Project

1887 births
1959 deaths
Baseball players from Colorado
Chicago Cubs players
Cincinnati Reds players
Columbus Senators players
Kansas City Packers players
Louisville Colonels (minor league) players
Major League Baseball pitchers
People from Riverside, California
Philadelphia Phillies players
Sportspeople from Colorado Springs, Colorado
St. Louis Cardinals players